Giuseppe Altea (born 11 June 1997) is an Italian footballer who plays as a winger for Italian club Mariglianese.

Club career
He made his professional debut in the Lega Pro for Paganese on 9 May 2015 in a game against Foggia.

References

External links
 
 

1997 births
Living people
Italian footballers
Sportspeople from the Province of Naples
Association football wingers
A.S.D. Victor San Marino players
A.C. Isola Liri players
Paganese Calcio 1926 players
U.S. Salernitana 1919 players
Serie C players
Eccellenza players
Italian expatriate footballers
Expatriate footballers in San Marino
Italian expatriate sportspeople in San Marino
Footballers from Campania